The election for Resident Commissioner to the United States House of Representatives took place on November 4, 1924, the same day as the larger Puerto Rican general election and the United States elections, 1924.

Candidates for Resident Commissioner
 Félix Córdova Dávila for the Republican Union
 Fernando J. Géigel for the Socialist Party

Election results

See also 
Puerto Rican general election, 1924

References 

Puerto Rico
1924